Ricardo Margarit Calvet (8 December 1884 – 30 December 1974) was a Spanish rower. He competed in the men's coxed four event at the 1900 Summer Olympics.

References

External links

1884 births
1974 deaths
Spanish male rowers
Olympic rowers of Spain
Rowers at the 1900 Summer Olympics
Sportspeople from the Province of Barcelona
Real Club Marítimo de Barcelona rowers